Karen Clark (born 6 April 1978) is a Canadian rower. She competed in the women's eight event at the 2004 Summer Olympics.

References

External links
 

1978 births
Living people
Canadian female rowers
Olympic rowers of Canada
Rowers at the 2004 Summer Olympics
People from Delta, British Columbia